Kivimaa-Moonlight Bay is a resort village in the Canadian province of Saskatchewan within Census Division No. 17. It is on the shores of Turtle Lake in the Rural Municipality of Mervin No. 499.

History 
Kivimaa-Moonlight Bay incorporated as a resort village on January 1, 1989.

Demographics 

Government 
The Resort Village of Kivimaa-Moonlight Bay is governed by an elected municipal council and an appointed administrator that meets on the third Tuesday of every month. The mayor is Steven Nasby and its administrator is Jackie Helgeton.

See also 
List of communities in Saskatchewan
List of municipalities in Saskatchewan
List of resort villages in Saskatchewan
List of villages in Saskatchewan
List of summer villages in Alberta

References 

Resort villages in Saskatchewan
Mervin No. 499, Saskatchewan
Division No. 17, Saskatchewan